The Europe/Africa Zone was one of three groups of Davis Cup competition in 2006.

Group I

Group II

Group III

Venue 1
Venue: Teniski Klub MLADOST, Banja Luka, Bosnia and Herzegovina (clay)
Date: 19–23 July

(scores in italics carried over)

Monaco and Estonia promoted to Group II in 2007.
Armenia and Andorra relegated to Group IV in 2007.

Venue 2
Venue: BTA Centre (Notswane Courts), Gaborone, Botswana
Date: 26–30 July

(scores in italics carried over)

Denmark and Nigeria promoted to Group II in 2007.
Botswana and Rwanda relegated to Group IV in 2007.

Group IV
Venue: Marsa Sports Club, Marsa, Malta (hard)
Date: 19–23 July

(scores in italics carried over)

Mauritius, Madagascar, Iceland, and San Marino promoted to Group III in 2007.

See also
Davis Cup structure

 
Europe Africa
Davis Cup Europe/Africa Zone